Travelogue is the debut album of Danish rock band Kashmir. It was released in 1994.

Track listing

Kashmir (band) albums
1994 debut albums